Katalin Móni is a Hungarian sprint canoer who has competed in the early 2000s. She won a bronze medal in the K-4 1000 m event at the 2002 ICF Canoe Sprint World Championships in Seville.

References
 Results of Hungarian canoers at Nagymaros Kayak Club website

Hungarian female canoeists
Living people
Year of birth missing (living people)
ICF Canoe Sprint World Championships medalists in kayak
21st-century Hungarian women